Ian Levack Aitken (19 September 1927 – 21 February 2018) was a British journalist and political commentator.

Early life 
Aitken was born in Airdrie, Lanarkshire. His father, George, a Lanarkshire infantryman radicalised by his experiences in the first world war trenches, fought with the Republican side in the Spanish Civil War. George Aitken was also a member of the Communist Party of Great Britain; however, he resigned following the CPGB's support for the Hitler-Stalin Pact.

Aitken was educated at the King Alfred School, Hampstead, Lincoln College, Oxford, and the LSE. At Oxford he befriended the future politicians Shirley Williams and Bill Rodgers.

Aitken served in the Fleet Air Arm from 1945 to 1948.

Career 
Aitken entered journalism in 1953 as the industrial correspondent of the Tribune newspaper, after a spell as a HM inspector of factories and a trade union official. The following year (1954) he joined the Daily Express and filled a number of positions at the paper before joining The Guardian in 1964, where for 10 years he was political correspondent. From 1975 to 1990 he was The Guardian's political editor, succeeded by Michael White. He also wrote occasional unpaid columns for Tribune, under the title "Rattling the Bars", and continued to write until the age of 87.

Political views 
Politically Aitken was 'traditional' left-of-centre (sometimes called 'classic labour'), being against the Iraq War, and accused New Labour of having "hijacked" the Labour Party.

Personal life 
Aitken lived the majority of his life in Highgate, North London. His wife Catherine died in 2006 after an almost fifty year marriage.

Aitken died on 21 February 2018 and was survived by his two daughters and four grandchildren. Among those paying tribute to Aitken's life was the broadcaster Iain Dale. His ashes were placed in the grave of his wife Catherine on the eastern side of Highgate Cemetery.

References

1927 births
2018 deaths
Burials at Highgate Cemetery
English political journalists
The Guardian journalists
People educated at King Alfred School, London
Alumni of Lincoln College, Oxford
People from Airdrie, North Lanarkshire